Ugryumikha is a rural locality (a village) in Bereznikovskoye Rural Settlement, Sobinsky District, Vladimir Oblast, Russia. The population was 18 as of 2010.

Geography 
Ugryumikha is located 15 km south of Sobinka (the district's administrative centre) by road. Dubrovo is the nearest rural locality.

References 

Rural localities in Sobinsky District